Mackarness is a surname, and may refer to:
 Charles Mackarness (1850–1918), English footballer and Archdeacon of the East Riding
 Frederick Coleridge Mackarness (1854–1920), British barrister, judge and politician
 George Mackarness (1822–1883), Anglican Bishop of Argyll and The Isles
 John Mackarness (1820–1889), Church of England Bishop of Oxford
 Matilda Anne Mackarness (1826–1881), English children's novelist

See also
Mackarness family tree, showing the relationship between the above.

External links
Mackarness family website